Eslamabad Mohammad Hoseyn (also Romanized as Eslāmābād Moḥammad Hoseyn; also known simply as Eslāmābād) is a village in Zaz-e Gharbi Rural District, Zaz va Mahru District, Aligudarz County, Lorestan Province, Iran. At the 2006 census, its population was 67, in 12 families.

References 

Towns and villages in Aligudarz County